"Born to Make You Happy" is a song by American singer Britney Spears from her debut studio album, ...Baby One More Time (1999). It was released on December 6, 1999, by Jive Records, as the fourth single from the album in Europe. Spears—whose vision for her sound differed stylistically from that of her producer's—was unhappy with the sexual overtones of the song, and the song underwent at least one re-write before its release. The singer first recorded the vocals for the track in March 1998, which were later re-recorded the same year. The teen pop song alludes to a relationship that a woman desires to correct, not quite understanding what went wrong, as she comes to realize that she was "born to make [her lover] happy".

"Born to Make You Happy" received mixed to positive reviews from music critics, who praised Spears' vocals and deemed it an early classic, but criticized the song's message. The song achieved success throughout Europe, topping the charts in Ireland and the United Kingdom and reaching the top five in 15 countries, including Austria, Belgium, Finland, Italy, Germany, Netherlands, Norway, Romania, Sweden and Switzerland. An accompanying music video, directed by Bille Woodruff, was released. The video portrays Spears dreaming that she is with her lover, while she sings and dances during the majority of the video. Spears has performed "Born to Make You Happy" on four concert tours.

Background
Before recording her debut album, Spears had originally envisioned it in style of "Sheryl Crow music, but younger [and] more adult contemporary". However, the singer agreed with her label's appointment of producers, who had the objective to reach a teen public at the time. She flew to Cheiron Studios in Stockholm, Sweden, where half of the album was recorded from May 1998, with producers Max Martin, Denniz Pop and Rami Yacoub, among others. "Born to Make You Happy" was written and produced by Kristian Lundin, and co-written by Andreas Carlsson, and was the first work by the duo. Spears originally recorded the vocals for the song in 1998, at Battery Studios in New York City, New York. They were later re-recorded in May 1998 at Cheiron Studios, and used on the album version, while the original vocals were used on the "Bonus Remix" of the song. It was also mixed at Cheiron Studios by Max Martin. Esbjörn Öhrwall played the guitar, while keyboards and programming was done by Lundin. Background vocals were provided by Carlsson and Nana Hedin. "Born to Make You Happy" was released in Europe as the fourth single from ...Baby One More Time on December 6, 1999. It was not released as a single in the United States, where "From the Bottom of My Broken Heart" was released as the album's fourth single instead.

Composition

"Born to Make You Happy" is a teen pop and pop song that lasts for four minutes and three seconds. The song is composed in the key of B minor and is set in time signature of common time, with a moderately slow tempo of 84 beats per minute. Spears vocal range spans over an octave, from F3 to B4. The song's lyrics are about a relationship that a woman desires to correct, not quite understanding what went wrong, as she comes to realize that "I don't know how to live without your love/I was born to make you happy". Writing for Pink News, Mayer Nissim described its lyrics as being about "capturing that pain, denial, and self-pitying misery right after things go south". "Born to Make You Happy" has a basic sequence of Bm–G–D–A as its chord progression.

David Gauntlett, author of Media, gender, and identity: an introduction (2002), noted that, despite wanting her lover next to her in the song, Spears' "fans see her as assertive, strong and confident, and an example that young women can make it on their own". The singer revealed in an interview with Rolling Stone, the writers had to re-write the original lyrics of the song. "I asked them to change the words to 'Born to Make You Happy.' It was a sexual song," she revealed. "I said, 'This may be a little old for me.' Because of the image thing, I don't want to go over the top. If I come out being Miss Prima Donna, that wouldn't be smart. I want to have a place to grow".

Critical response
"Born to Make You Happy" received mixed to positive reviews from music critics. Kyle Anderson of MTV considered the song's chorus more than "a little bit off-putting," saying the first lines of it "could be a sentiment that a lovelorn 16-year-old can understand, but it also sounds like Spears is in training to be a geisha". Craig MacInnis of Hamilton Spectator said "["Born to Make You Happy"] verges on the sort of boy-worshipping dreck that even Tiffany would have sniffed at". Mike Ross of Edmond Sun said, as Spears emotes in the song, "the message behind the music is worse than mere sweet nothings. [...] So much for Girl Power". Amanda Murray of Sputnikmusic considered "Born to Make You Happy" a "proficient but entirely unrememberable song," while Andy Petch-Jex of musicOMH considered the song an "early classic". Christopher Rosa, from Glamour, deemed it Spears' tenth best song, calling it an "euphoric slice of late nineties bubblegum, featuring some of her fullest vocals and one of her most memorable bridges". Shannon Barbour from Cosmopolitan called it a "prime stare-out-the-widow-pretending-to-be-in-an-emotional-music-video song". Digital Spy's Alim Kheraj praised  "Spears' pure vocals and the dreamlike production".

For Alex Macpherson from The Guardian, it's one of the best examples of Spears' "distressing vulnerability" as well as her best song; "a determined erasure of the autonomous self [...] 'Born to Make You Happy' is horrifying as text and irresistible as pop, and the two are inextricable". While reviewing ...Baby One More Time on its 20th anniversary, Billboards Chuck Arnold felt that "the old-fashioned sentiment of this song - that a girl is born to please her guy - feels even more antiquated 20 years later. Still, this song is a teen-pop dream". For Daniel Megarry from Gay Times, it was one of the "standout tracks" from ...Baby One More Time and wrote that "it’s impossible not to feel nostalgia when the melancholic beats of 'Born To Make You Happy' grace your eardrums". Mayer Nissim pointed out that "on the surface the lyrics are more than a little limp and pathetic, but [...] the powerful pop backing and unbreaking vocals show that Britney will more than live to fight (and love) another day". Nicholas Hautman, from Us Weekly, said that the song "may not have aged well, but there is no question that it has some of Spears' best vocals".

Commercial performance
On January 29, 2000, "Born to Make You Happy" debuted at number one on the UK Singles Chart becoming Spears' second UK number one. The song shipped over 400,000 copies in the United Kingdom, earning a gold certification by the British Phonographic Industry (BPI) in February 2021. It is her sixth best-selling single in the country. In Ireland, the song also entered the Irish Singles Chart at number one on January 20, 2000, while peaking at number two on the European chart. In Sweden, "Born to Make You Happy" debuted at number four on December 23, 1999, peaking at number two in the following week. The song has shipped over 30,000 copies in the country, earning a platinum certification by the International Federation of the Phonographic Industry (IFPI). In Germany, the song earned a gold certification by The Federal Association of Music Industry (BMVI), after peaking at number three on the charts. In France, "Born to Make You Happy" reached number nine, and was certified gold by the Syndicat National de l'Édition Phonographique (SNEP). The single was not released in the United States.

Promotion

Music video

Jive Records commissioned a music video for the song to be directed by Bille Woodruff. It was produced under Geneva Films, while the choreography was created by Wade Robson. The video premiered on November 13, 1999. The narrative of the video shows Spears dreaming as she sleeps in her room. As the dream begins, Spears is shown in a blue and silver futuristic room with several different levels, where she sings and walks around, and puts her feet on the wall while wearing a shiny silver outfit. MTV news reporter Ellen Thompson considered it the sexiest moment of the music video. As the video continues, Spears is seen on top of the apartment building she lives in, performing a dance segment in a red top and black skirt with a few backup dancers. The following scenes shows the singer wearing white clothes and singing in the room in which she is sleeping, while her love interest comes into her room to see her. Together, they start a pillow fight that shortly ends after Spears is shown again in her room still sleeping, however, now with a smile upon her face. A longer dance segment intercalates with all the scenes during the whole video.

Anna Ben Yehuda, from Time Out magazine, called it Spears' eleventh best video; "we don't know why Brit is dreaming of making someone happy by dancing on a stage in space, but we don't care, because that choreography is dope". Negative criticism came from Bustles Kaitlin Reilly, who panned it as "patently ridiculous".

Live performances
Spears performed the song for the very first time at her L'Oreal Hair Zone Mall Tour in New York City, USA on July 1, 1998. "Born to Make You Happy" has been performed by Spears on four tours. On her first big tour, ...Baby One More Time Tour, she sang the song seated on a staircase, while on her second tour, Crazy 2k, the performance of the song included a full dance segment. On the Oops!... I Did It Again Tour, Spears performed "Born to Make You Happy" wearing pajamas and slippers, with a dance segment near the end. "Born to Make You Happy" was performed for the last time on Dream Within a Dream Tour, where Spears emerged from the middle of a giant musical box on the stage as a ballerina, to perform the song in a medley with "Lucky" and "Sometimes", right after the performance of "Overprotected". Spears also performed "From the Bottom of My Broken Heart" and "Born to Make You Happy" on Disney Channel in Concert in 1999. The performances were recorded and included on Spears' first home video release, Time Out with Britney Spears.

Track listing

European CD
"Born to Make You Happy" (album version) – 4:03
"Born to Make You Happy" (Bonus remix) – 3:40

European maxi CD
"Born to Make You Happy" (album version) – 4:03
"Born to Make You Happy" (Bonus remix) – 3:40
"(You Drive Me) Crazy" (Jazzy Jim's hip-hop mix) – 3:40
"...Baby One More Time" (answering machine message) – 0:21

UK maxi CD
"Born to Make You Happy" (radio edit) – 3:35
"Born to Make You Happy" (Bonus remix) – 3:40
"(You Drive Me) Crazy" (Jazzy Jim's hip-hop mix) – 3:40

Cassette
"Born to Make You Happy" (radio edit) – 3:35
"Born to Make You Happy" (Bonus Remix) – 3:40
"...Baby One More Time" (answering machine message) – 0:21

European 7" vinyl
"Born to Make You Happy" (album version) – 4:03
"(You Drive Me) Crazy" (Jazzy Jim's hip-hop mix) – 3:40

Credits and personnel
 Britney Spears – lead vocals
 Kristian Lundin – songwriting, producer, keyboards, programming
 Andreas Carlsson – songwriting, background vocals
 Nana Hedin – background vocals
 Esbjörn Öhrwall – bass, guitar
 Max Martin – mixing
 Michael Tucker – pro-tools engineer
 Reza Safina – assistant engineer
 Tom Coyne – audio mastering
Source:

Charts

Weekly charts

Year-end charts

All-time charts

Certifications

Release history

References

Bibliography

1999 songs
Britney Spears songs
1999 singles
1990s ballads
Irish Singles Chart number-one singles
Jive Records singles
Pop ballads
Music videos directed by Bille Woodruff
Songs written by Andreas Carlsson
Songs written by Kristian Lundin
UK Singles Chart number-one singles
UK Independent Singles Chart number-one singles
Number-one singles in Scotland
Songs containing the I–V-vi-IV progression